Sun Jie may refer to:

 Sun Jie (footballer), Chinese professional footballer
 Sun Jie (rower), Chinese rower
 Jane Jie Sun (born 1969/1970), Chinese businesswoman, CEO of Ctrip